Sir John Stephen Barrington Simeon, 4th Baronet DL (31 August 1850 – 1909) was one of the two Members of Parliament for Southampton at the end of the 19th century and the start of the 20th century.

He was born at Swainston Manor in West Wight on 31 August 1850 and succeeded his father, the 3rd baronet, in 1870. He served as Ensign in the Rifle Brigade until he married Isabella Mary, daughter of the Hon Ralph Heanage Dutton, in 1872. The marriage was childless. In 1880 he became private secretary to the Rt Hon John Bright, MP, and entered parliament himself in 1895 as a Liberal Unionist. Shortly after his election he commissioned a private railway station at Watchingwell, some four miles (6 km) west of Newport. On 5 December 1903 he was appointed Honorary Colonel of the Southampton-based 1st Hampshire Royal Garrison Artillery (Volunteers).

Re-elected in 1900, Simeon left the House of Commons in 1906 and died three years later. He was succeeded as 5th baronet by his brother, Edmund Charles (1855–1915).

Notes

References

External links 
 

1850 births
1909 deaths
UK MPs 1895–1900
UK MPs 1900–1906
Rifle Brigade officers
Baronets in the Baronetage of the United Kingdom
Deputy Lieutenants of the Isle of Wight
Members of the Parliament of the United Kingdom for Southampton
Liberal Unionist Party MPs for English constituencies
John